Viktor Vladimirovich Shasherin (born 23 July 1962) is a former Soviet speedskater.

He set world record in 5,000 m in Medeo in 1984, with the time 6:49.15.

He set world record in 3,000 m in Davos in 1986, with the time 4:03.22.

World records 

Source: SpeedSkatingStats.com

References

External links
 Viktor Sjasjerin at SpeedSkatingStats.com

1962 births
Living people
Sportspeople from Almaty
Soviet male speed skaters
Kazakhstani male speed skaters
Speed skaters at the 1984 Winter Olympics
Olympic speed skaters of the Soviet Union
World record setters in speed skating
World Allround Speed Skating Championships medalists